The After Party Tour was the sixth headlining concert tour by American pop singer Aaron Carter.

Background
The tour was announced on Carter's Facebook page on January 11, 2013. In his post, he stated, "I’m happy to announce that I will be going on my long overdue tour #TheAfterPartyTour! Stay tuned for more dates that will be added soon. Here we go"! This was Carter's first tour in nine years. Following numerous career downfalls, the singer felt he would not have the opportunity to tour again. After his stint on Dancing with the Stars, Carter performed several one-off concerts, including the Summer MixTape Festival in 2012. Before the tour commenced, the singer left his tenure performing as Matt on the off-Broadway play The Fantasticks.

The tour began in February 2013 at the Chance Theater in Poughkeepsie, New York. The tour name stems from Carter's best-selling album, Aaron's Party (Come Get It).

Opening acts

Nikki Flores (select dates)
Petrel (select dates)
Alexis Babini (select dates)
Chrystian (select dates)
Justin Levinson (select dates)
Lineup Atlantic (select dates)
The Move Alongs (select dates)
The Real Hooks (select dates)
The Drive (Poughkeepsie)
The Dedication (Poughkeepsie)
Sam DeRosa (Poughkeepsie—September 2013)
This is the Now (Poughkeepsie—September 2013)
What is This (Amherst)
Verse (Amherst—September 2013)
Jay Loftus (Syracuse)
Big Dan's iPad Experience (Syracuse)
Leo LeMay (Syracuse)
Project Boy Machine (Syracuse)
Marcus Meston (Pittsburgh)
Hope Vista (Asbury Park)
Nick Barilla (Pittsburgh)
Corey Balsamo (Amityville)
6 Stories Told (Amityville—March 2013)
Ali Kramer (Amityville—March 2013)
Persona (Amityville—March 2013)
Waterparks (Houston—May 2013)
Lexxi Saal (Amityville—September 2013)
Dangerous Me (Amityville—September 2013)
Charlotte Sometimes (Asbury Park)
Jenni Reid (Jacksonville—March 2013)
Promise Me Scarlet (Akron)
Spencer Saylor (Columbus)
7th Heaven (St. Charles)
Chris Koon (Louisville, Joliet)
Quiet Out Loud (Joliet)
Ship Captain Crew (Joliet)
Carson Allen (Denver—March 2013)
Something Like Seduction (Tucson)
Cat Call (Tucson)
Bangarang (Tucson)
Kenny Holland (Scottsdale)
Brandon Burrill (Ramona)
Joel Simson (West Hollywood)
Savannah Phillips (West Hollywood)
Fredrick Daniel (West Hollywood)
Charlotte Bash (West Hollywood)
Danielle Taylor (Agoura Hills)
Truth Under Attack (Seattle)
Dylan Jakobsen (Seattle)
Matt Bacnis (Seattle)
The Ninth Step (Seattle)
Legends of the Fall (Stanhope)
Emily Kern (Stanhope)
Rachel Miller (Stanhope)
Joy Ride (Stanhope)
Just Sayin (Stanhope)
Two Step With Marlon Brando (Stanhope)
Opus 99 (Richmond—April 2013)
Chris Scholar (Richmond—April 2013)
Kyle Thornton (Richmond—April 2013)
A Collegiate Affair (Richmond—April 2013)
Astro Safari (Saratoga)
Ryan Cabrera (DeKalb)	
Tyler Hilton (DeKalb)	
Teddy Geiger (DeKalb)
Erin Ivey (Austin)
Shelby Blondell (Baltimore)
Surviving Allsion (Tupelo)
GLOtron (Tupelo)
Automatic Love Gun (Tupelo)
AyyO (Fargo)
Triz (Fargo)
Vince Tomas (select dates)
Adam Mardel (select dates)
Jaci'e (Canton, Dayton)
JLarant (Canton, Dayton)
Kid Riz (Teaneck)
Like Violet (Teaneck)
Dirty Pop (Auburn)
THEYCALLMEPIANO (Silver Spring)

Setlist
"Another Earthquake"
"America A O"
"When It Comes to You"
"Bounce" / "I Would" / "Iko Iko" / "To All the Girls"
"I'm All About You"
"Leave It Up to Me"
"That's Life"
"Do You Remember"
"City Lights"
"My First Ride"
"That's How I Beat Shaq"
"I Want Candy"
"Cowgirl (Lil' Mama)"
"Aaron's Party (Come Get It)"

Tour dates

Festivals and other miscellaneous performances
This concert was a part of "X-Fest"
This concert was a part of the "Northalsted Market Days"
This concert is a part of the "Block Party on The Boulevard"

Box office score data

Critical response
The tour received noted praise from many music critics. Allie Caren (The Daily Orange) writes the crowd was beyond excited to see Carter perform at his concert in Syracuse. She continues, "The overall tone of Carter's performance would have made all 90s kids in the audience reminiscent of the first Backstreet Boys or N Sync concert they ever attended. There is something about a pop star singing a feel-good pop song and dancing coordinated, pop-style moves—with back-up dancers—that brings a smile to an audience member's face".

In Northampton, Jake Reed (The Daily Collegian) estimates a successful comeback for Carter. He says, "Overall, the night was a success, because unlike other former child sensations, Carter didn’t spend the entire night removing himself from the image that he will always be known for. While odes to modern rap hits showed a new side of the 25-year-old's personality, it was respectable that he didn’t shy away from singing and dancing like he was 12 years old again". At the concert in Annapolis, Daneille Stern and Natasha Peavy (The Johns Hopkins News-Letter) called the energy of Carter's stage performance electric. They go on to say, "Throughout the concert, Carter was enthusiastic about engaging with the crowd, even going so far as to kiss a few select girls on the cheek and bring those with the best Carter-centric posters on stage for an Instagram photo-op".

Personnel
Music: DJ D-Nyce
Dancers: Trey Rich and Nikko Rich
Choreographer: Geo Hubela

External links
The Official Aaron Carter Site

References

2013 concert tours
Aaron Carter